The 2008–09 HV71 season saw HV71's attempt to defend their Swedish Championship title and win the regular season for a second consecutive season. It was the 25th season in the Swedish elite league Elitserien for the club. The club ended fourth after the regular season and managed to go to the finals but was beaten by Färjestads BK who won the Swedish Championship.

HV71 started the season in the beginning of August playing in the Nordic Trophy, finishing in fifth place, and continued to play in an exhibition game against Malmö Redhawks. HV71 opened the Elitserien regular season against Frölunda HC on September 15, winning the game 6–2. During the first 16 regular season games HV71 never scored the first goal in any of the matches. After the end of the regular season, HV71 ended as the fourth ranked team in the Elitserien regular season standings.

During the season, HV71 played in the inaugural season of the Champions Hockey League. The first group stage match was played in Jönköping on October 8 against the Swiss team SC Bern. HV71 won the game with a score of 6–2. The group stage matches were played in October to beginning of December 2008. HV71 finished second in group B and did not qualify for the semi-finals.

Off-season
April 28: Defenceman Per Gustafsson and winger Johan Lindström re-signed with HV71. Both agreed to a one-year extension. Defenceman Lance Ward and centre Jari Kauppila left for play in Germany and Finland respectively.

May 5: Centre Yared Hagos signed a one-year contract with HV71 as their first new signing for the season 2008–09.

May 8: Defenceman Johan Åkerman left and signed with the Russian team Lokomotiv Yaroslav.

May 9: HV71 signed defenceman Nicholas Angell to a one-year contract. Due to Swedish tax laws Angell will join the club in October 2008.

May 19: HV71 signed youth players Henrik Eriksson, Simon Önerud, David Ullström and youth goaltender Christoffer Bengtsberg to a one-year contract.

June 19: HV71 signed right winger Kim Staal to a one-year contract.

June 21: Left winger Mattias Tedenby drafted by the New Jersey Devils in the 2008 NHL Entry Draft.

July 1: Wingers Per Ledin and Andreas Jämtin used their NHL out-clauses and signed with the Colorado Avalanche and New York Rangers, respectively.

July 8: HV71 signed winger Teemu Laine to a one-year contract.

July 22: HV71 re-signed winger David Fredriksson to a one-year contract.

Pre-season
HV71 began the pre-season playing in the Swedish-Finnish tournament Nordic Trophy, a total of nine games plus two playoff games, from August 7 to September 6, 2008. HV71 ended the tournament as the fifth placed team after defeating Färjestads BK in the last playoff game. Before the regular Elitserien season started HV71 played against the HockeyAllsvenskan team Malmö Redhawks in Malmö.

Nordic Trophy

Standings

Game log

Playoffs
HV71 ended the 2008 Nordic Trophy regular round as the eight seed. The played in the semi-final for the fifth place game against Kärpät. With a win over the Finnish team, HV71 played and won against Färjestads BK and clinched a final Nordic Trophy ranking as the fifth placed team.

Regular season

Standings

Game log

Playoffs 
HV71 ended the 2008–09 regular season as the fourth placed team and was paired with the last playoff team, the eighth seed, Timrå IK, after the 1st through 3rd seeded teams picked their opponents for the quarterfinals.

Player stats

Skaters
Note: GP = Games played; G = Goals; A = Assists; Pts = Points; +/- = Plus/minus; PIM = Penalties in Minutes

Regular season

Updated after the end of the regular season

Playoffs

Updated after the end of the playoffs

Goaltenders
Note: GP = Games played; TOI = Time on ice (minutes); W = Wins; L = Losses; T = Ties; OTW = Overtime Wins; OTL = Overtime Losses GA = Goals against; SO = Shutouts; Sv% = Save percentage; GAA = Goals against average

Regular season

Updated after the end of the regular season

Playoffs

Updated after the end of the playoffs

Champions Hockey League
HV71 played in group B in the 2008–09 Champions Hockey League. The group's matches were played between October 8 and December 3, 2008. HV71 finished on second place and did not qualify for the semi-finals.

Group B standings
x - clinched playoff spot, e - eliminated from playoff contention

Game log

Transactions

1 Left HV71 after 38 games in season 2008–09.
2 Contracted in late January for the remainder of season 2008–09.

Roster

Draft picks
HV71 players picked at the 2009 NHL Entry Draft.

References

2008-09
HV71